The Khuzestan Premier League is the premier football league of Khuzestan province and the fifth-highest in the Iranian football pyramid after the 3rd Division. Prior to the 2017-18 season, the league maintained 14 teams, however beginning with the 2017-18 season, 16 teams compete in one group with the winner of the league being promoted to the 3rd Division and the last place team getting relegated to the Khuzestan Division 1 League. The league is also part of the Vision Asia program. The season begins in August or September and runs until March.

Format 
In the past, the number of teams has fluctuated. Prior to the 2017-18 season, the league comprised 14 teams.  However, since then, the league has expanded to 16 teams. Over the course of a season, which runs annually from August to March, each team plays twice against the others in the league, once at home and once away, resulting in each team competing in 30 games in total. Three points are awarded for a win, one for a draw and zero for a loss. The teams are ranked in the league table by points gained, then goal difference, then goals scored and then their head-to-head record for that season.

At the end of the season, the club with the most points becomes the champion of the league. The Champion gets promoted to the 3rd Division League while the bottom team is relegated to the Khuzestan League 1.

2019–20 season
The 2019-20 season marks the 20th season of the Khuzestan premier League and will begin in August 2019 with 16 teams from across the Khuzestan province.

Champions

References

 
Sport in Khuzestan Province
5
2000 establishments in Iran
Sports leagues established in 2000